Philautus saueri is a species of frog in the family Rhacophoridae.
It is endemic to Malaysia.

Its natural habitat is subtropical or tropical moist montane forests.

References

Amphibians of Malaysia
Endemic fauna of Malaysia
saueri
Nepenthes infauna
Amphibians described in 1996
Taxonomy articles created by Polbot